Riverview Community School District (RCSD) is a school district headquartered in Riverview, Michigan, United States. It is responsible for Riverview Community High School, Seitz middle school and three elementary schools, along with a preschool and a virtual academy.

The 3 Elementary Schools include: Memorial, Huntington, and Forest.  

Former schools in the district include Hale Elementary at the corner of Longsdorf and Krause.  Currently occupied by a baseball diamond next to the High School.  Also Jack Downing Elementary which is the current location of the Police Department.

References

External links
 Riverview Community School District

School districts in Michigan
Education in Wayne County, Michigan